PC Player was a German computer magazine that was published from December 1992 until June 2001. The founders were Heinrich Lenhardt and Boris Schneider. During its existence the magazine was published by three different companies: DMV-Verlag, WEKA Verlag and Future Verlag GmbH. It was published on a monthly basis. The magazine reached its peak circulation of 140,000 copies in March 1994. İn 1996 it was the best-selling European PC magazine.

References

1992 establishments in Germany
2001 disestablishments in Germany
Defunct computer magazines
Defunct magazines published in Germany
Computer magazines published in Germany
Monthly magazines published in Germany
Magazines established in 1992
Magazines disestablished in 2001